Eugen Deutsch (born 9 November 1907 in Ludwigshafen, Rheinland-Pfalz, Germany, killed 8 February 1945 (aged 37) in Großsteinhausen, Rheinland-Pfalz, Germany) was a German weightlifter who competed in the 1936 Summer Olympics and won a silver medal in light-heavyweight category. He lifted a total of 365 kg (clean and press - 105 kg, snatch - 110 kg, clean & jerk - 150 kg) at bodyweight  of 81 kg.

He set one light-heavyweight press world record in 1934. He was a member of the club SC Augusta Augsburg from Augsburg. He was killed in action during World War II.

References

External links
Eugen Deutsch's profile at Sports Reference.com

1907 births
1945 deaths
German male weightlifters
Weightlifters at the 1936 Summer Olympics
Olympic silver medalists for Germany
Olympic medalists in weightlifting
Olympic weightlifters of Germany
Medalists at the 1936 Summer Olympics
Sportspeople from Ludwigshafen
German military personnel killed in World War II
20th-century German people